The Rose of Tistelön (Swedish: Rosen på Tistelön) is a 1945 Swedish historical romantic drama film directed by Åke Ohberg and starring Eva Henning, John Ekman and Arnold Sjöstrand. It was shot at the Centrumateljéerna Studios in Stockholm. The film's sets were designed by the art director Bibi Lindström. It is based on the 1842 novel The Rose of Tistelön by Emilie Flygare-Carlén.

Synopsis
In Bohuslän during the nineteenth century, the daughter of a notorious smuggler falls in love with the son of a customs officer.

Cast
 Eva Henning as Gabriella Haraldsson
 John Ekman as 	Håkan, hennes far
 Arnold Sjöstrand as Birger, hennes bror
 Bengt Ekerot as Anton, hennes bror
 Marianne Löfgren as Erika
 George Fant as 	Arve Arnman
 Gunnar Sjöberg as Arnman senior, Arves far
 Linnéa Hillberg as 	Katrina, Arves mor
 Oscar Ljung as 	Kapten Rosenberg
 Olof Winnerstrand as Askenberg
 Rune Halvarsson as 	Petter Lindgren, jungman
 Siri Olson as Lena 
 Inga Landgré as 	Josefine
 Gösta Gustafson as Simon jaktkarl 
 Ernst Brunman as Länsman
 Georg Skarstedt as Lutter, Farmhand
 Henrik Schildt as 	Mårten 
 John Elfström as 	First Mate
 Birger Åsander as Boat Man 
 Artur Cederborgh asPostal clerk
 Gustaf Färingborg as 	Police Officer 
 Segol Mann as 	Crew Member

References

Bibliography 
 Forslund, Bengt. Victor Sjöström: hans liv och verk. TPB, 1980.
 Krawc, Alfred. International Directory of Cinematographers, Set- and Costume Designers in Film: Denmark, Finland, Norway, Sweden (from the beginnings to 1984). Saur, 1986.

External links 
 

1945 films
Swedish drama films
1945 drama films
1940s Swedish-language films
Films directed by Åke Ohberg
Swedish historical films
1940s historical films
Films set in the 19th century
Films based on Swedish novels
1940s Swedish films